is a sport shooter who competed in the 1992 Summer Olympics and in the 1996 Summer Olympics.

References

1947 births
Japanese male sport shooters
Skeet shooters
Olympic shooters of Japan
Shooters at the 1992 Summer Olympics
Shooters at the 1996 Summer Olympics
Shooters at the 1990 Asian Games
Shooters at the 1994 Asian Games
Shooters at the 1998 Asian Games
Living people
Asian Games competitors for Japan
20th-century Japanese people